The 2013 Campeonato da 1ª Divisão do Futebol started on 11 January 2013 and ended on 23 June 2013.

League table

References

External links
Macau Football Association

Campeonato da 1ª Divisão do Futebol seasons
Macau
Macau
1